The 2016 Rally Catalunya (formally the 52. RallyRACC Catalunya – Costa Daurada) was the eleventh round of the 2016 World Rally Championship. The race was held over four days between 13 October and 16 October 2016, and was based in Salou, Catalonia, Spain. Volkswagen's Sébastien Ogier won the race, his 37th win in the World Rally Championship, securing his fourth world champion title.

Entry list

Overall standings

Special stages

Power Stage
The "Power stage" was a  stage at the end of the rally.

References

Catalunya
Rally Catalunya
Catalunya Rally